John T. Morton (born 1966) is a former American government official who served as the director of U.S. Immigration and Customs Enforcement (ICE) from 2009 to 2013. Morton was appointed unanimously by the U.S. Senate on May 12, 2009. Morton stepped down from ICE in July 2013 and currently works as the Chief Compliance and Ethics Officer at Capital One, a bank with headquarters in Virginia.

Background

Morton was born to an American father and British mother and raised in Loudoun County, Virginia. He graduated from Episcopal High School before attending the University of Virginia (UVA) for a bachelor's degree in English and history and the University of Virginia Law School for his JD. He served in the Peace Corps between his schooling at UVA. He worked for the Department of Justice for 15 years prior to being appointed Director of ICE.

Philosophy

In an interview conducted shortly after his appointment, Morton emphasized a need for moderation:

And you're putting people in jail, and that's good work but it's also awesome work. I mean your actions lead to somebody going to jail. So I think, you know, the way to look at Government service is as a great honor and privilege... As a Government employee, balanced perspective is critical, trying to reach the common good is critical. You're not an extreme advocate. Your job is to try to get it right, and that's a very rewarding and satisfying position to be in.

Morton's ICE

One of Morton's first acts in office was an expansion of I-9 audits. These were applied to over 650 businesses suspected of employing undocumented workers.

Morton also expressed dissatisfaction at ICE's reliance on state and local prisons to house detainees, stating: "Immigration detention is a civil function, it is not a penal function. Over the years, however, the system has largely become dependent on excess jail space."  Under his leadership, ICE constructed a new detention center in Karnes County, Texas. Morton called the new detention facility "sensible, sustainable and attentive to the unique needs of the individuals in our custody".

Political response
Because he worked on controversial issues, Morton complained of criticism from the right and the left. "I can get criticized on the same issue from both sides on the same day," he said in 2010.

Personal life

Morton is married and has two daughters.

References

External links

Official ICE biography
Interview about ICE policy and priorities

Living people
U.S. Immigration and Customs Enforcement officials
University of Virginia School of Law alumni
1966 births
Peace Corps volunteers
People from Inverness
Obama administration personnel
People from Loudoun County, Virginia
University of Virginia alumni
Episcopal High School (Alexandria, Virginia) alumni